Russell David "Russ" Roberts (born September 19, 1954) is an American economist. He is currently a research fellow at Stanford University's Hoover Institution and president of Shalem College in Jerusalem. He is known for communicating economic ideas in understandable terms as host of the EconTalk podcast.

Roberts describes himself as a classical liberal, stating, "I believe in limited government combined with personal responsibility. So I am something of a libertarian, but ... that term comes with some baggage and some confusion."

Education
Roberts was awarded a B.A. in economics in 1975 from the University of North Carolina and a PhD in economics from the University of Chicago in 1981 for his thesis on the design of government transfer programs under the supervision of Gary Becker.

Career
Roberts has previously taught at George Mason University, Washington University in St. Louis (where he was the founding director of what is now the Center for Experiential Learning), the University of Rochester, Stanford University, and the University of California, Los Angeles. He is a regular commentator on business and economics for National Public Radio's Morning Edition, and has written for The New York Times and The Wall Street Journal.

Roberts also blogs at Cafe Hayek with Donald J. Boudreaux at George Mason University in Fairfax County, Virginia.

Roberts writes and publishes videos on economics, some of which have been viewed millions of times. One of the most widely watched videos is Fear the Boom and Bust, a rap battle between 20th century economists John Maynard Keynes and Friedrich von Hayek.

Books about Economics

Roberts has written a number of books which illustrate economic concepts in unconventional ways.

In 2001, he published the novel The Invisible Heart: An Economic Romance, which conveys economic ideas through conversations between two fictional teachers at an exclusive high school in Washington, D.C.: one is a market oriented economics instructor, and the other is an English teacher who wants governmental protections that curb the excesses of unrestrained capitalism.

In 2008, Roberts released another novel, The Price of Everything: A Parable of Possibility and Prosperity, which focuses on the experiences of Ramon Fernandez, a university student and star tennis player who, as a child, accompanied his mother to the U.S. after she fled from Fidel Castro's Cuba. Like The Invisible Heart, The Price of Everything uses conversations between its main characters to address economic concepts (in this case ideas such as the price system, spontaneous order and the possibility of price gouging in crisis situations).

In 2014, Roberts offered an uncommon perspective on Adam Smith in his book, How Adam Smith Can Change Your Life: An Unexpected Guide to Human Nature and Happiness. The book does not discuss Smith's well known 1776 work, The Wealth of Nations; it instead examines Smith's 1759 precursor to behavioral economics, The Theory of Moral Sentiments.

Policy Positions
Roberts generally opposes Keynesian economics—particularly stimulus spending—saying that "it's very hard to argue in logical terms that spending money unwisely is the way to get wealthy." In October 2011 he initiated a lively, extended conversation with the Nobel laureate Paul Krugman over the effectiveness of Keynesian policies by declaring that "Krugman is a Keynesian because he wants bigger government. I'm an anti-Keynesian because I want smaller government." Krugman quoted this statement in his response and then said that "Keynesianism is not and never has been about promoting bigger government," and also that "you find conservative economists promoting quite Keynesian views of stabilization policy." In subsequent posts, the two economists disagreed on many things, but neither one contested one central idea: Krugman was content to be characterized as a Keynesian, while Roberts was not.

Roberts has urged those who formulate public policy and the economists who advise them to be more skeptical of the findings of empirical studies, and he views ultra-specific claims by politicians that their promoted policies will produce a certain number of jobs or a certain amount of growth as inherently unreliable.

EconTalk
Roberts has hosted the weekly economics podcast EconTalk since March 2006. The podcast is hosted by the Library of Economics and Liberty, an online library sponsored by Liberty Fund. On the podcast, Roberts has interviewed more than a dozen Nobel Prize laureates including Nobel Prize in Economics recipients Ronald Coase, Milton Friedman, Abhijit Banerjee, Gary Becker, and Joseph Stiglitz as well as Nobel Prize in Physics recipient Robert Laughlin. He has also interviewed people such as Patrick Collison, Sam Altman, Marc Andreessen, Sam Harris and Nassim Nicholas Taleb.

Shalem College

Roberts was appointed the third president of Shalem College in November 2020, a position he assumed in March 2021. In explaining the college's selection of Roberts, Chair of the Executive Committee of Shalem’s International Board of Governors Yair Shamir pointed to Roberts’s American educational background as a deciding factor, as well as his outspoken belief in the necessity of a true liberal arts education today.

Publications

Books

Articles and papers
 Roberts, Russ. "Working Papers in Economics": Domestic Studies Program (Hoover Institution on War, Revolution and Peace):
 
 Also published as: 
 
 Also published as:

See also
 Fear the Boom and Bust – a 2010 hip-hop music video with a mock debate between economists John Maynard Keynes and Friedrich von Hayek

References

External links

  – a listing of EconTalk episodes in which Roberts interviews various guests discussing economic topics
 Robert's bio at the Mercatus Center
 NPR Commentary, "Economist: Don't Jump the Gun on Stimulus Plans"
 
 C-SPAN Q&A interview with Roberts and John Papola about Fear the Boom and the Bust and The Fight of the Century, June 26, 2011
 A recent Roberts interview
 Russ Roberts explains his Epistemological views on The Filter

1954 births
Living people
American libertarians
Austrian School economists
University of Chicago alumni
George Mason University faculty
Libertarian economists
NPR personalities
People from Memphis, Tennessee
Mercatus Center
Economists from Tennessee
21st-century American economists
Hoover Institution people